WEGA (1350 AM, Candelita7) is a radio station licensed to Vega Baja, Puerto Rico. The station serves the Puerto Rico area. The station broadcasts religious programming. WEGA signed on the air on February 20, 1973. WEGA is owned by Ricardo Alfonso Angulo; who is the son of the late owner of The San Juan Star, Gerry Angulo, through licensee A Radio Company, Inc. The station is operated under a Time Brokerage Agreement by Ministerio en Pie de Guerra, Inc.

On November 10, 2014, WEGA went off the air for almost a year.  On March 9. 2016, WEGA returned to air Faro de Santidad programming on 1350 AM, after a year of absence.

On February 7, 2018, WEGA switched to Candelita7, an online radio station owned by Evangelist Eddie Rivera Jr. better known as "Candelita". Candelita7 airs on 1350 AM, and worldwide via internet: www.candelita7.com.

References

External links

Vega Baja, Puerto Rico
Radio stations established in 1973
1973 establishments in Puerto Rico
Companies that have filed for Chapter 11 bankruptcy
EGA